Francesco Besozzi (born 1766 in Dresden – 1816 ibid) was an Italian oboist and member of a renowned family of wind players. From 1792 to 1816 he was at the service of the royal court of Dresden.

References

1766 births
1816 deaths
Italian oboists
Male oboists